İsmail Baydil (born 26 February 1988) is a Turkish footballer who plays for Kozanspor. He made his Süper Lig debut for Denizlispor against Galatasaray on 23 August 2008.

References

External links
 
 İsmail Baydil at eurosport.com
 İsmail Baydil at goal.com
 

1988 births
Living people
Sportspeople from Denizli
Turkish footballers
Turkey under-21 international footballers
Denizlispor footballers
Süper Lig players
Association football midfielders